Krystyna Machnicka-Urbańska (born 13 March 1947) is a Polish fencer. She competed at the 1972 and 1976 Summer Olympics.

References

1947 births
Living people
Polish female fencers
Olympic fencers of Poland
Fencers at the 1972 Summer Olympics
Fencers at the 1976 Summer Olympics
Sportspeople from Katowice
20th-century Polish women